The 2020 Campeonato Rondoniense de Futebol Profissional Série“A” was the 75th edition and the 30th professional edition of the state championship of Rondônia organized by FFER.

The championship began on 1 February and ended on 5 December. On 17 March, FFER suspended the championship for 15 days due to the COVID-19 pandemic in Brazil, but on 1 April after a new meeting with some clubs, via videotelephony, FFER decided to extend the suspension indefinitely. Finally, the tournament resumed behind closed doors on 7 November.

Porto Velho won their first Campeonato Rondoniense title after defeating Real Ariquemes 3–1 on aggregate in the finals. As champions, Porto Velho qualified for the 2021 Copa do Brasil, while the runners-up, Real Ariquemes, qualified for the 2021 Copa Verde. Both teams qualified for the 2021 Série D.

Format
In the first stage, the 11 teams were divided into two regionalized groups. Each group was played on a home-and-away round-robin basis. The teams were ranked according to the following criteria: 1. Points (3 points for a win, 1 point for a draw, and 0 points for a loss); 2. Wins; 3. Head-to-head results (only between two teams); 4. Goal difference; 5. Goals scored; 6. Fewest red cards; 7. Fewest yellow cards; 8. Draw in the headquarters of the FFER. The top two teams of each group advanced to the semi-finals.

In the semi-finals and the finals, each tie was played on a home-and-away two-legged basis. The finals were played with the best overall performance team hosting the second leg. In the final stages, if tied on aggregate, the penalty shoot-out would be used to determine the winner.

Initially, the teams with the lowest number of points of each group would be relegated to the Série B do Campeonato Rondoniense de 2021. However, FFER cancelled the relegations due to the suspension of the Campeonato caused by coronavirus pandemic.

Participating teams
Originally eleven teams played the first stage, but after the suspension due to the COVID-19 pandemic only four teams remained in the tournament.

Team information
Teams in italic withdrew from the tournament during the suspension due to the COVID-19 pandemic.

Managers

Managerial changes

First stage

Group A

Group B

Final stages

Semi-finals

|}

Group C

Porto Velho advanced to the finals.

Group D

Real Ariquemes advanced to the finals.

Finals

|}

Matches

Statistics

Top goalscorers

Highest attendance

Broadcasting rights
The most important matches, including the finals, will be broadcast by RedeTV! Rondônia and Globoesporte.com in addition to radio stations of Rondônia.

See also
  «Campeonato Rondoniense 2020 tem clubes definidos» 
 campeonato-rondoniense-de-futebol
 site da tabela do campeonato rondoniense de futebol 
 site dos campeonatos da Região Norte do Brasil de futebol

References

Rondoniense
Campeonato Rondoniense